The Yaqui Cur is a 1913 American silent Western black and white film directed by D. W. Griffith, written by Stanner E.V. Taylor and starring Robert Harron, Kate Bruce, Walter Miller, Charles Hill Mailes and Victoria Forde. Griffith directed seven films with more than one reel, including The Yaqui Cur and The Little Tease (1913).

This film is one of the most ambiguous spatial moments in Griffith's work because the gesture is so forcefully directed outward, and it is considered one of Griffith's most bizarre films. There is a romance between a Native American woman and a white man.

Cast
 Robert Harron as Strongheart, a Yaqui Youth
 Kate Bruce as Strongheart's Mother
 Walter Miller as Ocallo, Strongheart's Friend
 Lionel Barrymore as The Easterner
 Frank Opperman as The Preacher
 Charles Hill Mailes as The Yaqui Chief / Goldseeker
 Victoria Forde as The Yaqui Chief's Daughter
 Jennie Lee as Yaqui Woman
 William J. Butler as In Tribe / Goldseeker
 Christy Cabanne as Undetermined Minor Role
 Frank Evans as Goldseeker
 Charles Gorman as In Tribe
 Harry Hyde as Goldseeker
 J. Jiquel Lanoe as In Tribe
 Audrey Littlefield as Yaqui Child
 Joseph McDermott as Goldseeker
 Alfred Paget as In Tribe
 Baby Lillian Wade as Yaqui Child

See also
 D. W. Griffith filmography
 Lionel Barrymore filmography

References

External links
 
 

1913 films
1913 Western (genre) films
American black-and-white films
American silent short films
Biograph Company films
Films directed by D. W. Griffith
Films shot in California
Films with screenplays by Stanner E.V. Taylor
General Film Company
Silent American Western (genre) films
1910s American films
1910s English-language films